Vijayabahu I (born Prince Keerthi) (ruled 1055–1110), also known as Vijayabahu the Great, was a medieval king of Sri Lanka. Born to a royal bloodline, Vijayabahu grew up under Chola occupation. He assumed rulership of the Ruhuna principality in the southern parts of the country in 1055. Following a seventeen-year-long campaign, he successfully drove the Cholas out of the island in 1070, reuniting the country for the first time in over a century.  During his reign, he re-established Buddhism in Sri Lanka and repaired much of the damage caused to infrastructure during the wars. He offered the Thihoshin Pagoda(Lord of Sri Lanka Buddha image) to Burma king Alaungsithu and it is now still in Pakokku.

Early life
Vijayabahu was born around 1039, by the name of Kitti (Keethi) in Ruhuna principality, under Chola occupation.  As a result there were  When he was fifteen years old Kitti defeated the last of such rulers, Lokissara, with the aim of becoming the king of Ruhuna. Subsequently, in 1055, he became king of Ruhuna and attained the name of Vijayabahu.

According to the "Panakaduwa Copper " (Panakaduwa inscription which written on copper sheets about the gifts, offerings and given by King Vijayabahu I to his higher military officer) King Vijayabahu I's own words says that Prince Kiththi and King Moggallana's whole family was under the protection of Ruhunu Dandanayaka Sitnaru-bim Budalnavan and he provided a great support to the king to make the country under the same flag.

The Chola army frequently attacked Vijayabahu's troops in Ruhuna. However, he managed to free Ruhuna from the Cholas by 1058 and take it under his complete control.

Revolts against the Cholas 

In the 11th Century, the Chola Empire of Southern India reached its imperial state. Emperor  Rajaraja I Invaded and annexed the Kingdom of Anuradhapura in 992, while his son Emperor Rajendra I invaded Ruhuna in 1017, capturing king Mahinda V. The kingdom became an subadatrate of the Cholas while Kassapa VI, the son of Mahinda ascended the throne.

First Battle of Polonnaruwa 
After securing Ruhuna, his intention was to capture Polonnaruwa, the capital of the country. In 1066, he launched the first attack on Polonnaruwa, and captured and held the city for a brief time. However, after receiving reinforcements from South India, the strengthened Chola army attacked again, forcing Vijayabahu to flee.

He established himself in Wakirigala after this and concentrated on organizing his army for a fresh attempt to capture Polonnaruwa. During this time, he also had to face rebellions from other Sinhala leaders fighting for the throne. Overcoming these rebellions, Vijayabahu continued to muster his armies in order to retake the Capital, but was not strong enough to attempt another attack against the Chola army. He made Katharagama in Ruhuna as his capital and also he started to organize an army to defeat the Cholas.

Second Battle of  Polonnaruwa 

Civil war broke out during 1069–1070 in the Chola Empire in South India, Tamil Nadu, throwing the country into turmoil. The concerns within Chola empire prevented the empire from focusing on Sri Lanka, providing an opportunity for Vijayabahu to attack again while the Chola forces in Polonnaruwa were more or less isolated.
He has gained the support of many kingdoms to defeat the Cholas such as Burma and Pandya who also wanted to defeat Cholas in their kingdom.

Starting from Mahanagakula on the south of the Walawe river, Vijayabahu dispatched three armies to attack Polonnaruwa from three fronts. One army was sent along the western shore of the country to Mahathittha port to deal with any reinforcements arriving from South India. Afterwards, part of this army moved towards Polonnaruwa and attacked from the North-west, while the other part held the ports to prevent reinforcements from arriving. A second army was sent from the east across Magama to attack Polonnaruwa from the east. The third and main force advanced across the country, led by the king. Surrounded by these three armies, Polonnaruwa was besieged for seven months before king Vijayabahu’s forces entered the city. In 1070, Vijayabahu became the ruler of Polonnaruwa.  At that time Sri Lanka was known as Thambapanni.

Ruling of the country

After the victory at Polonnaruwa, Vijayabahu had to face more rebellions. This caused him to delay his coronation, which took place in 1072 or 1073, eighteen years after being crowned as Vijayabahu in Ruhuna and after a military campaign that lasted seventeen years. Polonnaruwa was renamed “Vijayarajapura” and chosen as the capital, making Vijayabahu the first Sinhala king of the Polonnaruwa Kingdom. The coronation ceremony was held in a palace built for this purpose in Anuradhapura, the former capital of the country. Vijayabahu took Lilavati, the daughter of Jagatipala of Kannauj as his queen. He also married Tilokasundari, a princess from Kalinga, with the view of strengthening ties with the Kalingas.

During the Chola rule and the wars, Buddhism in the country had suffered a lot and Buddhist monks were few. Five ordained monks—necessary for the upasampada (ordination) of Buddhist monks—could not be found in the whole country. To re-establish Buddhism in the country, Vijayabahu sought help from King Anawrahta in Burma. As a result, ordained monks were sent from Burma to Sri Lanka. These monks helped to re-establish Buddhism by ordaining new monks and teaching the Pitaka. In addition to this, Vijayabahu also repaired several Buddhist temples that were abandoned and destroyed. A new temple was also constructed in Polonnaruwa for the keeping of the sacred tooth relic of the Buddha.The history says that the monks in both countries got together to make an acceptable version in the scriptures when the interpretation of the "Thripitaka" are different with each other.

Vijayabahu also reconstructed a number of tanks in Rajarata destroyed during the wars, in addition to constructing several new tanks. This reconstruction of the irrigation system in Rajarata area was important to the development of the country since the country depended mainly on paddy cultivation.

Around 1084/1085, another quarrel with the Chola kingdom erupted when some ambassadors of Vijayabahu sent to West Chalukya were harassed by them. However, the king's decision for another war against the Chola Empire caused the Velakkara mercenaries serving in Vijayabahu’s army to rebel against him. Several generals of the army were killed by the mutineers and the royal palace was burned down. Vijayabahu fled to Wakirigala again but returned to Polonnaruwa and recaptured it, suppressing the rebellion. The rebel leaders were captured and executed.

Vijayabahu is also noted for constructing roads to Sri Pada and building resting places called ambalama for the benefit of the pilgrims. He also granted villages and cultivations for the service of the pilgrims and the shrine. This is recorded in the "Ambagamu" inscription which situated by the King Vijayabahu I.

Death

Vijayabahu died in 1110, having reigned as king of Sri Lanka for fifty-five years. He was then known as “Mahalu Vijayabahu” (Vijayabahu the old) due to his age and long rule of the country. He is also commonly referred to as Maha Vijayabahu (Vijayabahu the great). The Vijayabahu Infantry Regiment of the Sri Lanka Army is named after him.

See also
 Mahavamsa
 List of monarchs of Sri Lanka
 History of Sri Lanka
 Vijayabahu Infantry Regiment

References

Monarchs of Polonnaruwa
V
1110 deaths
1030s births
V
V
V
Buddhist monarchs
Sri Lankan Buddhists